S'ang District is a district (srok) of Kandal Province, Cambodia. The district is subdivided into 12 communes (khum) such as Khpob, Kaoh Khael, Kaoh Khsach Tonlea, Krang Yov, Prasat, Preaek Ambel, Preaek Koy, S'ang Phnum, Svay Prateal, Ta Lon, Traeuy Sla, Tuek Vil and 119 villages (phum).

Administration

References

External links
Kandal at Royal Government of Cambodia website
Kandal at Ministry of Commerce website

Districts of Kandal province